Northland Echo was a sternwheel steamship operated by the Northern Transportation Company on the Mackenzie River system.

In 1910 the vessel carried the first buffalo to the new Buffalo National Park in Alberta.

References

External links
 

Steamships of Canada
Water transport in the Northwest Territories